is a former Japanese football player.

Club career
Minoguchi was born in Hokkaido on 23 August 1965. After graduating from Kokushikan University, he joined Furukawa Electric (later JEF United Ichihara) in 1988. He played 67 games and scored 14 goals in Japan Soccer League. From 1993, he played for Japan Football League club PJM Futures (1993-1994), Fukuoka Blux (1995) and Oita Trinity (1996).

National team career
In 1988, Minoguchi was selected Japan national "B team" for 1988 Asian Cup. At this competition, he played 2 games. However, Japan Football Association don't count as Japan national team match because this Japan team was "B team" not "top team"

Club statistics

References

External links

1965 births
Living people
Kokushikan University alumni
Association football people from Hokkaido
Japanese footballers
Japan Soccer League players
J1 League players
Japan Football League (1992–1998) players
JEF United Chiba players
Sagan Tosu players
Avispa Fukuoka players
Oita Trinita players
1988 AFC Asian Cup players
Association football forwards